Cheryl K. Acton is an American politician serving in the Utah House of Representatives, representing District 43. Acton was appointed on September 18, 2017.

Early life and career
Acton was born and raised in Kansas before moving to Arizona for her senior year of high school. She now lives in West Jordan. She graduated from Brigham Young University with a BA in English. She has also worked for the U.S. Census Bureau and the Department of Defense, where she earned the Meritorious Service Award. She has been a freelance writer and editor, an independent contractor, an internet researcher, a newspaper reporter, and a teacher.

Political career
In September 2017, Rep. Adam Gardiner stepped down from his legislative post to become Salt Lake County Recorder. The votes to replace Gardiner were tied: Acton and Lyle Decker split the votes of 52 GOP delegates in the second round of voting, and the race was decided with a coin toss. Acton won reelection in 2018, defeating Democratic challenger Diane Lewis with 47.94 percent of the popular vote. In the legislature, she has proposed and passed legislation restricting access to abortion.

During the 2022 General Session, Acton served on the Executive Offices and Criminal Justice Appropriations Subcommittee, the House Health and Human Services Committee, and the House Judiciary Committee.

2022 Sponsored Legislation
HB0006	Executive Offices and Criminal Justice Base Budget, HB0029S02	Driving Offenses Amendments, HB0055	Juvenile Justice Services Amendments, HB0319S01	Jordan River Improvement Amendments, HB0330	Department of Public Safety Restricted Account Amendments, HB0431	Social Credit Score Amendments, HB0439S01	Elected Public Body Transparency Amendments, HCR010	Concurrent Resolution Regarding an Interlocal Agreement Creating the Jordan River Commission, Concurrent Resolution Encouraging Prevention of Adverse Childhood Experiences

Personal life
Acton and her husband, Scott, have four children, two sons and two daughters. As a family, they have traveled together to all 50 states. They have resided in West Jordan for the past 26 years.

References

Living people
Women state legislators in Utah
Republican Party members of the Utah House of Representatives
Year of birth missing (living people)
Brigham Young University alumni
21st-century American politicians
21st-century American women politicians